Clemente de la Cruz Delgado (1905 – death date unknown) was a Cuban outfielder in the Negro leagues in the 1930s.

A native of Guanabacoa, Cuba, Delgado played for the Cuban Stars (East) in 1936. In his three recorded games, he posted five hits and three RBI in 15 plate appearances. Delgado went on to play in the Mexican League in the 1940s, where he notably played in the first official game in club history for the Tecolotes de Nuevo Laredo.

References

External links
Baseball statistics and player information from Baseball-Reference Black Baseball Stats and Seamheads

1905 births
Date of birth missing
Year of death missing
Place of death missing
Cuban Stars (East) players
Baseball outfielders
Baseball players from Havana
Tecolotes de Nuevo Laredo players
Industriales de Monterrey players
Cuban expatriate baseball players in Mexico